John Palmer (29 March 1881 – 14 June 1928) was an English cricketer. Palmer was a right-handed batsman who bowled right-arm medium pace. He was born at Ibstock, Leicestershire.

Palmer made his first-class debut for Leicestershire against Essex in the 1906 County Championship at Aylestone Road, Leicester. He made two further first-class appearances in that season's County Championship, against Kent and Northamptonshire. In his three matches, he took 8 wickets at an average of 26.12, with best figures of 3/14. With the bat he scored 27 runs at an average of 5.40, with a high score of 13.

He died at the village of his birth on 14 June 1928. His son George also played first-class cricket.

References

External links
John Palmer at ESPNcricinfo
John Palmer at CricketArchive

1881 births
1928 deaths
People from Ibstock
Cricketers from Leicestershire
English cricketers
Leicestershire cricketers